Ellen Burstyn is an American actress of film, television and theatre.

She is known for her film performances in Peter Bogdanovich's The Last Picture Show (1971), William Friedkin's The Exorcist (1973), and Martin Scorsese's Alice Doesn't Live Here Anymore (1974). She also has appeared in such films as Harry and Tonto (1974), Same Time, Next Year (1978), Resurrection (1980), and Requiem for a Dream (2000).

She is also known for her performances in television such as Big Love (2007–2011), Political Animals (2012), Louie (2014), and House of Cards (2016).

Filmography

Film

Source: Turner Classic Movies

Television

Theater

References 

Burstyn, Ellen
Burstyn, Ellen